This article describes the history of South African cricket from the end of the Second World War in 1945 to the start of South Africa's cricket isolation in 1970.

International feeling against South Africa's apartheid policy became stronger and more vociferous as the post-war era developed.  Until the mid-1960s, however, the South Africa national cricket team continued to play regularly and without undue difficulty against Australia, England and New Zealand.

But matters came to a head in 1968 when the South African government refused to allow a tour by England whose team included Basil D'Oliveira.  Although the Australians visited South Africa in 1969–70, the end was nigh for apartheid in sport and South Africa was banned from Test cricket for 22 years.  This happened just at a time when the South African team was arguably the strongest in world cricket.

In 1970, after South Africa's tour of England was cancelled, a Rest of the World team toured instead.  It was captained by Gary Sobers and included other non-white players from the West Indies, India and Pakistan.  It also included four of the greatest South African players (Eddie Barlow, Graeme Pollock, Mike Procter and Barry Richards) who clearly had no problems about sharing a dressing room with other cricketers whose skin was a different colour to their own.

Domestic cricket from 1945 to 1970

Currie Cup winners from 1945-46 to 1969-70

 Not Contested: 1945-46, 1948-49, 1949-50, 1953-54, 1956-57, 1957-58, 1961-62, 1964-65
 1946-47 Natal
 1947-48 Natal
 1950-51 Transvaal
 1951-52 Natal
 1952-53 Western Province
 1954-55 Natal
 1955-56 Western Province
 1958-59 Transvaal
 1959-60 Natal
 1960-61 Natal
 1962-63 Natal
 1963-64 Natal
 1965-66 Natal and Transvaal (shared)
 1966-67 Natal
 1967-68 Natal
 1968-69 Transvaal
 1969-70 Transvaal and Western Province (shared)

International tours of South Africa from 1945-46 to 1969-70

England, 1948-49

 1st Test at Kingsmead, Durban – England won by 2 wickets
 2nd Test at Ellis Park Stadium, Johannesburg – match drawn
 3rd Test at Newlands Cricket Ground, Cape Town – match drawn
 4th Test at Ellis Park Stadium, Johannesburg – match drawn
 5th Test at St George's Park, Port Elizabeth – England won by 3 wickets

Australia, 1949-50

 1st Test at Ellis Park Stadium, Johannesburg – Australia won by an innings and 85 runs
 2nd Test at Newlands Cricket Ground, Cape Town – Australia won by 8 wickets
 3rd Test at Kingsmead, Durban – Australia won by 5 wickets
 4th Test at Ellis Park Stadium, Johannesburg – match drawn
 5th Test at St George's Park, Port Elizabeth – Australia won by an innings and 259 runs

New Zealand, 1953-54

 1st Test at Kingsmead, Durban – South Africa won by an innings and 58 runs
 2nd Test at Ellis Park Stadium, Johannesburg – South Africa won by 132 runs
 3rd Test at Newlands Cricket Ground, Cape Town – match drawn
 4th Test at Ellis Park Stadium, Johannesburg – South Africa won by 9 wickets
 5th Test at St George's Park, Port Elizabeth – South Africa won by 5 wickets

England, 1956-57

 1st Test at Wanderers Stadium, Johannesburg – England won by 131 runs
 2nd Test at Newlands Cricket Ground, Cape Town – England won by 312 runs
 3rd Test at Kingsmead, Durban – match drawn
 4th Test at Wanderers Stadium, Johannesburg – South Africa won by 17 runs
 5th Test at St George's Park, Port Elizabeth – South Africa won by 58 runs

Australia, 1957-58

 1st Test at Wanderers Stadium, Johannesburg – match drawn
 2nd Test at Newlands Cricket Ground, Cape Town – Australia won by an innings and 141 runs
 3rd Test at Kingsmead, Durban – match drawn
 4th Test at Wanderers Stadium, Johannesburg – Australia won by 10 wickets
 5th Test at St George's Park, Port Elizabeth – Australia won by 8 wickets

Commonwealth XI, 1959-60
A Commonwealth XI cricket team toured South Africa in October 1959, playing three first-class matches.  Captained by Denis Compton, the Commonwealth XI included several famous or well-known players such as Tom Graveney, Brian Close, Bert Sutcliffe, Frank Tyson, Godfrey Evans, Roy Marshall, Bob Simpson and Ian Craig

New Zealand, 1961-62

 1st Test at Kingsmead, Durban – South Africa won by 30 runs
 2nd Test at Wanderers Stadium, Johannesburg – match drawn
 3rd Test at Newlands Cricket Ground, Cape Town – New Zealand won by 72 runs
 4th Test at Wanderers Stadium, Johannesburg – South Africa won by an innings and 51 runs
 5th Test at St George's Park, Port Elizabeth – New Zealand won by 40 runs

England, 1964-65

 1st Test at Kingsmead, Durban – England won by an innings and 104 runs
 2nd Test at Wanderers Stadium, Johannesburg – match drawn
 3rd Test at Newlands Cricket Ground, Cape Town – match drawn
 4th Test at Wanderers Stadium, Johannesburg – match drawn
 5th Test at St George's Park, Port Elizabeth – match drawn

Australia, 1966-67

 1st Test at Wanderers Stadium, Johannesburg – South Africa won by 233 runs
 2nd Test at Newlands Cricket Ground, Cape Town – Australia won by 6 wickets
 3rd Test at Kingsmead, Durban – South Africa won by 8 wickets
 4th Test at Wanderers Stadium, Johannesburg – match drawn
 5th Test at St George's Park, Port Elizabeth – South Africa won by 7 wickets

Australia, 1969-70

 1st Test at Newlands Cricket Ground, Cape Town – South Africa won by 170 runs
 2nd Test at Kingsmead, Durban – South Africa won by an innings and 129 runs
 3rd Test at Wanderers Stadium, Johannesburg – South Africa won by 307 runs
 4th Test at St George's Park, Port Elizabeth – South Africa won by 323 runs

References

Further reading
 Rowland Bowen, Cricket: A History of its Growth and Development, Eyre & Spottiswoode, 1970
 South African Cricket Annual – various editions
 Trevor Chesterfield, South Africa's Cricket Captains: From Melville to Wessels, New Holland Publishers, 1999
 various writers, A Century of South Africa in Test & International Cricket 1889-1989, Ball, 1989

External links
 CricketArchive – itinerary of South African cricket

1949 in South African cricket
1950 in South African cricket
1957 in South African cricket
1958 in South African cricket
1961 in South African cricket
1962 in South African cricket
1966 in South African cricket
1967 in South African cricket
1970
1970
1970